Rubus neomexicanus, called the New Mexico raspberry, is a North American species of brambles in the rose family. It has been found only in the southwestern United States, in Arizona, Utah, Colorado, and New Mexico.

Rubus neomexicanus is a branching shrub up to 3 meters (10 feet) long, without prickles. Leaves are simple (non-compound) with heart-shaped or egg-shaped blades. Flowers are white. Fruits are red.

References

neomexicanus
Flora of the Southwestern United States
Plants described in 1853